Lewisham London Borough Council is the local authority for the London Borough of Lewisham in Greater London, England. It is a London borough council, one of 32 in the United Kingdom capital of London. The council is unusual in that its executive function is controlled by a directly elected mayor of Lewisham, currently Damien Egan. Lewisham is divided into 19 wards, each electing two or three councillors. There are currently 16 three member wards and 3 two member wards. Following the May 2018 election, Lewisham London Borough Council comprises 54 Labour Party councillors. The council was created by the London Government Act 1963 and replaced two local authorities: Deptford Metropolitan Borough Council and Lewisham Metropolitan Borough Council.

History

There have previously been a number of local authorities responsible for the Lewisham area. The current local authority was first elected in 1964, a year before formally coming into its powers and prior to the creation of the London Borough of Lewisham on 1 April 1965. Lewisham London Borough Council replaced Deptford Metropolitan Borough Council and Lewisham Metropolitan Borough Council, which had been created in 1900. Deptford corresponded to the parish of St Paul Deptford and was governed by a vestry prior to 1900. Lewisham Metropolitan Borough Council replaced the Lewisham District Board of Works and the Lee District Board of Works, although the Lewisham District also included Penge and the Lee District also included Charlton, Kidbrooke and Eltham, which all went to other local authorities after 1900.

It was envisaged that through the London Government Act 1963 Lewisham as a London local authority would share power with the Greater London Council. The split of powers and functions meant that the Greater London Council was responsible for "wide area" services such as fire, ambulance, flood prevention, and refuse disposal; with the local authorities responsible for "personal" services such as social care, libraries, cemeteries and refuse collection. This arrangement lasted until 1986 when Lewisham London Borough Council gained responsibility for some services that had been provided by the Greater London Council, such as waste disposal. Lewisham became an education authority in 1990. Since 2000 the Greater London Authority has taken some responsibility for highways and planning control from the council, but within the English local government system the council remains a "most purpose" authority in terms of the available range of powers and functions.

Data protection
In 2012 the Council was fined £70,000 by the Information Commissioner's Office (ICO) after a social worker "left files containing GP and police reports and allegations of sexual abuse and neglect in a shopping bag on a train". Commenting on Lewisham and other authorities who had made similar data protection breaches, the ICO said "It would be far too easy to consider these breaches as simple human error. The reality is that they are caused by councils treating sensitive personal data in the same routine way they would deal with more general correspondence. Far too often in these cases, the councils do not appear to have acknowledged that the data they are handling is about real people, and often the more vulnerable members of society." In August 2015, it was reported by the News Shopper that between April 2011 and April 2014, Lewisham Council had disclosed the public's sensitive data sixty-four times. However, the neighboring councils Bromley, Bexley and Greenwich did not commit any data breaches.

Spending cuts and savings

In December 2015, it was reported by The Guardian that the Mayor of Lewisham predicted that casualties of the next round of cuts would include youth work, libraries, parks, crime reduction, social care and street cleaning. In February 2016, Lewisham Council announced that it would be raising Council Tax by 3.99 percent in order to help meet the 15 million pounds of savings that is required each year. In February 2019, News Shopper reported that Lewisham Council needs to cut £30 million by 2021, but that they had only found where £21 million of these cuts would be made.

Powers and functions
The local authority derives its powers and functions from the London Government Act 1963 and subsequent legislation, and has the powers and functions of a London borough council. It sets council tax and as a billing authority also collects precepts for Greater London Authority functions and business rates. It sets planning policies which complement Greater London Authority and national policies, and decides on almost all planning applications accordingly.  It is a local education authority  and is also responsible for council housing, social services, libraries, waste collection and disposal, traffic, and most roads and environmental health.

Summary results of elections

References

Local authorities in London
London borough councils
Politics of the London Borough of Lewisham
Mayor and cabinet executives
Local education authorities in England
Billing authorities in England